Marcin Karczyński (born 6 July 1978) is a Polish cyclist. He competed in the men's cross-country mountain biking event at the 2004 Summer Olympics.

References

1978 births
Living people
Polish male cyclists
Olympic cyclists of Poland
Cyclists at the 2004 Summer Olympics
People from Sanok
20th-century Polish people